Gertrude Baumstark (21 May 1941 - 28 April 2020), was a Romanian and German chess player who holds the title of Woman International Master (WIM, 1970). She is a two-time winner of the Romanian Women's Chess Championship (1967, 1981).

Biography
From the mid-1960s, Gertrude Baumstark was one of the leading Romanian women's chess players. In Romanian Women's Chess Championships have won the nine medals: two gold (1967, 1981), six silver (1969, 1970, 1971, 1975, 1977, 1986) and bronze (1968). Participant of many international women's chess tournaments, achieved best results in Lublin (1969, shared 1st-2nd place), Pernik (1973, shared 1st-4th place), Lublin (1974, 1st place), Subotica (1974, shared 2nd-3rd place), Nałęczów (1978, shared 1st-2nd place). In 1970, she was awarded the FIDE Woman International Master (WIM) title.

Gertrude Baumstark four times participated in the Women's World Chess Championship Interzonal Tournaments:
 In 1971, at Interzonal Tournament in Ohrid shared 16th-17th place;
 In 1973, at Interzonal Tournament in Menorca has taken 12th place;
 In 1976, at Interzonal Tournament in Tbilisi shared 7th-8th place;
 In 1979, at Interzonal Tournament in Alicante shared 9th-10th place.

Gertrude Baumstark played for Romania in the Women's Chess Olympiads:
 In 1969, at second board in the 4th Chess Olympiad (women) in Lublin (+2, =2, -4),
 In 1972, at first reserve board in the 5th Chess Olympiad (women) in Skopje (+2, =2, -1) and won the team silver medal,
 In 1974, at second board in the 6th Chess Olympiad (women) in Medellín (+7, =4, -2) and won the team silver medal,
 In 1978, at second board in the 8th Chess Olympiad (women) in Buenos Aires (+8, =4, -1) and won the individual silver medal,
 In 1980, at second board in the 9th Chess Olympiad (women) in Valletta (+2, =1, -2).

Since 2004, Gertrude Baumstark represented Germany in international chess tournaments.

References

External links

1941 births
Sportspeople from Timișoara
Romanian female chess players
German female chess players
Chess Woman International Masters
Chess Olympiad competitors
2020 deaths
Romanian people of German descent